Edger is a surname. Notable people with the surname include: 

Henry Edger (1820–1888), English positivist
Joseph Frost Edger, British merchant in China and Hong Kong
Kate Edger (1857–1935), first woman in New Zealand to gain a university degree
Samuel Edger (c.1823–1882), New Zealand minister